Saint-Antoine is a commune in the Doubs department in the Bourgogne-Franche-Comté region in eastern France.

Geography

History
Saint-Antoine was earlier known as Rougebief after the stream that forms the boundary of the commune.

Population

See also
 Communes of the Doubs department

References

External links

 Saint-Antoine on the regional Web site 

Communes of Doubs